Insulasaurus arborens, also known as the Negros sphenomorphus, is a species of lizard of the family of Scincidae. It is endemic to the Philippines.

Distribution
It is found on the islands of Negros, Panay, Pan de Azúcar and Masbate at elevations below .

Original publication
 Taylor, 1917 : Snakes and lizards known from Negros, with descriptions of new species and subspecies. Philippine Journal of Science,  (texte intégral).

References

Insulasaurus
Lizards of Asia
Reptiles of the Philippines
Endemic fauna of the Philippines
Reptiles described in 1917
Taxa named by Edward Harrison Taylor